The 2012 Miller Superbike World Championship round was the sixth round of the 2012 Superbike World Championship season. It took place on the weekend of May 26–28, 2012 at Miller Motorsports Park, in Tooele, Utah, United States. The races were held on Memorial Day Monday.

Carlos Checa won the first race but lost the front and crashed in the second race while Marco Melandri finished second to Checa in the first race but won the second race. Still, it was Aprilia rider Max Biaggi that extended his lead in the championship standings by finishing third place in both races.

Superbike

Race 1 classification

Race 2 classification
The race was stopped after 3 laps due to Hiroshi Aoyama's crash, that spilt fluid on the track, and restarted an hour later on an 18-lap distance.

References

External links
 The official website of the Superbike World Championship

Miller Superbike World Championship
Miller
Superbike